Eduardo Muñoz Inchausti (born 1975) is a Chilean politician who served as Undersecretary of Culture during the first government of Michelle Bachelet (2006−2010).

References

External links
 

1975 births
Living people
21st-century Chilean politicians
University of Valparaíso alumni
Pontifical Catholic University of Valparaíso alumni
Socialist Party of Chile politicians
Unir Movement politicians